Krugersdorp Game Reserve is a 1500 Ha Game Reserve, located near the town of Krugersdorp, South Africa, approximately 40 minutes drive from central Johannesburg.  It is a "small, intimate reserve that offers visitors a true African safari experience.... without the hassle of travelling to a major reserve houses 15 mammal species, including one of the “Big Five”, while lions are kept in a special 100ha enclosure in the middle of the reserve.  The reserve is also popular for bird watching, and more than 200 species that have been recorded there;   Guests can travel the park in vehicles or on horseback.

Protected areas of Gauteng
Mogale City Local Municipality